Equestrian at the 2020 Summer Paralympics in Tokyo, Japan was held at the Tokyo Equestrian Park. There were eleven gender free events taking place: ten individual events and one mixed team event.

The 2020 Summer Olympic and Paralympic Games were postponed to 2021 due to the COVID-19 pandemic. They kept the 2020 name and were held from 24 August to 5 September 2021.

Qualification
Qualification was held from 1 January 2018 to 31 January 2020.

An NPC is allowed to have a maximum of four qualification slots:
 One eligible team of four athletes and minimum of three or maximum of four per individual events can contest. 
 At least one athlete must be eligible to be in sport classes grade I, grade II or grade III.

Officials
Appointment of officials is as follows:

Dressage
  Marco Orsini (Ground Jury President)
  Jeannette Wolfs (Ground Jury Member)
  Anne Prain (Ground Jury Member) - replaced  Alison Pauline King
  Kjell Myhre (Ground Jury Member)
  Katherine Lucheschi (Ground Jury Member)
  Marc Urban (Ground Jury Member) - replaced  Suzanne Cunningham
  Sarah Leitch (Ground Jury Member)
  Hanneke Gerritsen (Technical Delegate)

Medal table

Medalists

See also
Equestrian at the 2020 Summer Olympics

References

External links
Results book 

 
2020
2020 Summer Paralympics events
Equestrian sports competitions in Japan
2021 in equestrian
Para Dressage